Albert Reuter (11 September 1907 – 2 March 2003) was a Luxembourgian footballer. He competed in the men's tournament at the 1928 Summer Olympics. With Jean-Pierre Hoscheid and Jules Müller he co-managed the Luxembourg national football team from 1948 until 1949. They managed Luxembourg in the football tournament of the 1948 Summer Olympic Games where Luxembourg were eliminated in the first round 6–1 by Yugoslavia.

References

External links
 
 

1907 births
2003 deaths
Luxembourgian footballers
Luxembourg international footballers
Olympic footballers of Luxembourg
Footballers at the 1928 Summer Olympics
Sportspeople from Luxembourg City
Association football defenders
Luxembourgian football managers
Luxembourg national football team managers